The 2011 Gamba Osaka season was Gamba Osaka's 19th season in the J.League Division 1 and 25th overall in the Japanese top flight. It also includes the 2011 J.League Cup, 2011 Emperor's Cup, and the 2011 AFC Champions League.

Players

J.League

Table

Matches

Results by round

J.League Cup

Emperor's Cup

AFC Champions League

Group stage

Tiebreakers
Gamba Osaka and Tianjin Teda are ranked by their head-to-head records, as shown below.

Knock-out stage

References

Gamba Osaka
Gamba Osaka seasons